Hancock is a British comedy television series which aired on ITV in 1963. It starred Tony Hancock as a pompous, self-regarding figure similar to the character he had played on Hancock's Half Hour for the BBC.

Cast
As in his final BBC series, Hancock was the only regular performer in the show. Actors who appeared in individual episodes of the series included Dennis Price, Derek Nimmo, Francis Matthews, John Le Mesurier, Brian Wilde, Pauline Yates, James Villiers, Denholm Elliott, Kenneth Griffith, Geoffrey Keen, Billy Milton, Joan Benham, Peter Vaughan, Allan Cuthbertson, Wilfrid Lawson, Patrick Cargill, Patsy Smart, Adrienne Posta, Diane Clare, Michael Aldridge, Anthony Dawes, Olaf Pooley, Reginald Beckwith, Donald Hewlett and John Junkin.

Episodes and release
"The Assistant" (3 January 1963)
 "The Eye-Witness" (10 January 1963)
 "Shooting Star" (17 January 1963)
 "The Girl" (24 January 1963)
 "The Man on the Corner" (31 January 1963)
 "The Memory Test" (7 February 1963)
 "The Early Call" (14 February 1963)
 "The Craftsmen" (21 February 1963)
 "The Night Out" (28 February 1963)
 "The Politician" (7 March 1963)
 "The Reporter" (14 March 1963)
 "The Writer" (21 March 1963)
 "The Escort" (28 March 1963)

The series was not reviewed favourably at the time and was never repeated. 

Six of the episodes were eventually leaked onto the internet, but the remaining seven were unseen until Hancock’s great niece, Lucy Hancock, inherited the archive following the death of Hancock’s brother Roger. Roger Hancock, who acted as his brother’s agent in the last years of Hancock’s life, had been said to be reluctant to allow the episodes to be screened due to the varied quality of the star’s performance.

In 2022, all thirteen episodes were released by the archive television company Kaleidoscope on their  Kaleidoscope Home Media DVD label as Hancock The Complete ATV Series.

References

Bibliography
 Vahimagi, Tise . British Television: An Illustrated Guide. Oxford University Press, 1996.

External links
 

1963 British television series debuts
1963 British television series endings
1960s British comedy television series
ITV sitcoms
English-language television shows
Television shows produced by Associated Television (ATV)
Television shows shot at ATV Elstree Studios